Sir Gerald or Gerard Lally or O'Mullally  (? in Tuam, County Galway – 1737) was an Irish conservative and French military officer.

He was the second son of Thomas Lally (or O'Mullally) of Tullaghnadaly, by his wife, Jane, sister of Theobald Dillon, 7th Viscount Dillon, and younger brother of James Lally. He served with James II's forces in Ireland, and after the end of the Siege of Limerick (1691) he fled to France.

At Romans on 18 April 1701 he married Anne-Marie, the daughter of Charles Jacques de Bressac, seigneur de La Vache; they had a son Thomas Arthur Lally. On 7 July 1707 he was created a Baronet, in the Jacobite baronetage of Ireland, by James II's son, the titular James III.

On 28 July 1708 he was made Lieutenant Colonel of the famous Dillon's Regiment, named after his first cousin General Arthur Dillon. On 20 February 1734 he was made a Brigadier General in the French army. He died at Arras in November 1737, and was succeeded by his son.

His grandson was Gérard de Lally-Tollendal.

References

 Source: Marquis de Ruvigny, The Jacobite Peerage

See also
Thomas Arthur, comte de Lally

French generals
1737 deaths
17th-century Irish people
18th-century Irish people
Peers created by James Francis Edward Stuart
Baronets in the Jacobite peerage
Irish Jacobites
French people of Irish descent
People from County Galway
Irish soldiers in the French Army
Irish expatriates in France
Year of birth unknown